Runswick Bay Lifeboat Station was a Royal National Lifeboat Institution (RNLI) lifeboat station located in Runswick Bay in North Yorkshire, England. The station was opened in 1866, with a sister station opening at Staithes nine years later. Staithes Lifeboat Station was closed in 1922, and barring another short period of operation at Staithes, Runswick Bay was a mainstay of lifeboat operations on the Yorkshire coast until 1978, when Runswick Bay was closed and Staithes was re-activated.

The local population re-started a lifeboat in Runswick Bay in the early 1980s and this now functions as the Runswick Bay Rescue Boat (RBRB), which operates in conjunction with all rescue services on the coast and is part of the HM Coastguards' emergency activation process in the area

History
The first lifeboat to be stationed at Runswick Bay was The Sheffield in 1866. In April 1901, all the fit and able men were fishing in the bay when a sudden storm erupted over the area. Older men from the village were drafted in to man the boat, but it was pushed into sea by the women of the village.

In 1910, a new station was erected on the site of the previous lifeboathouse. The enlarged station was necessary to accommodate the new  Hester Rothschild.

In 1933, a new motorboat was received on station, and was named The Always Ready. After the coxswain of the lifeboat, Robert Patton, died at sea trying to rescue a crippled seaman, the boat was renamed Robert Patton - The Always Ready in 1934.

In 1978, the lifeboathouse was closed and the RNLI concentrated on their efforts on the lifeboathouse at Staithes.

Fleet

Runswick Bay Rescue Boat

After the RNLI withdrew their boat at Runswick Bay in favour of nearby Staithes, the local population at Runswick Bay raised the money to have their own rescue boat. It was felt that the popularity of the bay, particularly in the holiday season, would need some sort of rescue cover. The first boat was called Claymoor. The RBRB operates from the tractor storage shed in the lifeboat house that the RNLI did up until 1978.

The RBRB works alongside the RNLI to provide  a rescue service in Runswick Bay, particularly along the shoreline where the heavier rescue boats have trouble getting to.

Fleet

References

Sources

External links
Video of the naming and launch of the lifeboat Robert Patton - The Ever Ready in 1934

Lifeboat stations in Yorkshire
Buildings and structures in North Yorkshire